Penalty by Perception is the eighth studio album by Danish thrash metal band Artillery, released on 25 March 2016 on Metal Blade Records.
It was recorded throughout 2015 in Medley Studios, Copenhagen. The band also re-recorded the 1991 demo “Welcome to the Mindfactory” on this album.

Track listing

Personnel 
Michael Bastholm Dahl – vocals
Morten Stützer – guitars
Michael Stützer – guitars
Peter Thorslund – bass
Josua Madsen – drums

References 

2016 albums
Artillery (band) albums
Metal Blade Records albums